An island is a land mass entirely surrounded by water.

Island(s) may also refer to:

Places 

 Any of various islands around the world, see the list of islands
 Iceland, a Nordic island country in the North Atlantic Ocean
 Island, Belfast, Northern Ireland, an electoral ward in the United Kingdom
 Island, Kentucky, a city in the United States
 Island, Yonne, a commune of the Yonne département in France
 Island County, Washington, United States
 Islands (barony), a barony in County Clare, Ireland
 Islands (regional unit), a division of Attica, Greece

Books and publications

Fiction
 Island (Huxley novel), 1962, by Aldous Huxley
 The Island (Benchley novel), 1979, by Peter Benchley
 Island (Laymon novel), 1991, by Richard Laymon
 Island (novel series), 2000–2006, by Gordon Korman
 Island (Rogers novel), 1999, by Jane Rogers
 Island (short story collection), 2000, by Alistair MacLeod
 Island, a 1987 novel by Thomas Perry
 Island (Singer novel), 2015, by Nicky Singer, illustrated by Chris Riddell

Periodicals
 Islands, a travel magazine published by Bonnier Corporation

Music 
 Island (band), which represented Cyprus in the Eurovision Song Contest in 1981
 Islands (band), a Canadian indie rock band
 Island Records (disambiguation), several music industry record labels

Albums 
 Island (Bob Brookmeyer and Kenny Wheeler album), 2003
 Island (David Arkenstone album), 1989
 Island (G-Side album), 2011
 Island (HÖH and Current 93 album), 1991
 Island, by Bear's Den, 2014
 Islands (Ash  album), 2018
 Islands (The Band album), 1977
 Islands (Kajagoogoo album), 1984
 Islands (King Crimson album), 1971
 Islands (The Mary Onettes album), 2009
 Islands (Mike Oldfield album), 1987

Songs 
 "Island" (song), by Eddy Raven, 1990
 "Island (Float Away)", by the Starting Line, 2007
 "Island", by Heather Nova from Oyster, 1994
 "Island", by the Whitest Boy Alive from Rules, 2009
 "Islands" (King Crimson song), 1971
 "Islands" (Mike Oldfield song), 1987
 "Islands" (The xx song), 2009
 "An Island" (Chevelle song), 2014
 "An Island", by Owen from The King of Whys, 2016

Transport 
 Island, a synonym for a traffic roundabout
 Island platform, a railway platform with tracks running around each side
 Refuge island, for pedestrians crossing a road
 Traffic island, dividing the lanes of travel in a road

Visual media

Film 
 The Island (1980 film), a 1980 American film based on the novel by Peter Benchley
 Island (1989 film), a 1989 Australian film directed by Paul Cox
 The Island (2005 film), a 2005 science fiction film
 The Island (2006 film), also known as Ostrov, a Russian film directed by Pavel Lungin
 Island (2011 film), a British film directed by Brek Taylor, Elizabeth Mitchell
 Islands (2011 film), a 2011 Italian drama film
 Islands (2021 film), a 2021 Canadian drama film

Television 
 Islands (miniseries), a Cartoon Network miniseries, aired as part of the eighth season of Adventure Time
 Island (South Korean TV series), a 2022 television series
 Island (Iranian TV series)

Video games 
 Island (visual novel), a 2016 video game by Front Wing
 Islands: Non-Places, a 2016 video game by Carl Burton

Other uses 
 Islands (restaurant), a casual dining restaurant chain in the United States
 Island Company, clothing brand
 Island ECN, a network for stock trading, now part of Inet
 Island-class patrol boat, class of the United States Coast Guard Cutters
 Ecological island, a micro-habitat within a larger differing ecosystem
 Extraction island, in linguistics, phrases out of which extraction is impossible

See also
 The Island (disambiguation)